During the 2006–07 season, the Guildford Flames played their second season in the EPIHL. It was the 15th year of Ice Hockey played by the Guildford Flames. It was to be the tenth and final season under head coach Stan Marple.

The Flames made a solid start with nine wins in their first ten games to secure a cup semi-final place, but fell behind in the league after dropping points to Slough Jets and Sheffield Scimitars. Injuries to Jozef Kohut and netminder Joe Watkins then caused concern, but the final game of 2006 at the Spectrum produced a battle for top spot with Tom Annetts backstopping the team to a 3–1 victory over the Scimitars.

The New Year started bleakly. After losing only eight points in the first four months of the season, Guildford dropped nine in January. This persuaded Marple to make changes and he brought back Nick Cross from retirement and signed Robert Sobala from Solihull Barons as cover for Kohut. But Sobala lasted only 13 games before suffering a season-ending injury.

In the cup semi-final the Flames gained revenge over Slough, with Marian Smerciak's overtime winner putting them into the final against Milton Keynes Lightning. There they took a 3–2 home advantage to Milton Keynes and, in a thriller, triumphed 4–3. Marple and his men duly celebrated but it turned out to be their only trophy of the season.

Three losses in February and an injury to their top scorer, Milos Melicherik, put an end to them retaining the league title and they eventually slipped to fourth. After clinching a place in the playoff final, Melicherik returned for the weekend's games in Coventry. In a memorable semi, the Flames overcame the Scimitars 5–4 with Rick Plant scoring the winner 18 seconds before the end of overtime.

But their defeat by Bracknell Bees in the final was a bitter pill to swallow after they had lost only one of season's previous eight encounters against their local rivals.

Player statistics

Netminders 
The asterisk represents the fact that Tom Annetts and Joe Watkins shared a shutout.

Results

Pre season

Regular season

Playoffs

End of Season Awards 
 Player's Player of the Year – Vaclav Zavoral
 Player of the Year – Vaclav Zavoral
 Top Points Scorer – Milos Melicherik
 Most Sportsmanlike – Rick Skene
 British Player's Player of the Year – Rick Plant
 British Player of the Year – David Savage

References

External links 
 Official Guildford Flames website

Guildford Flames seasons
Gui